Ronitt Rubinfeld is a professor of electrical engineering and computer science at MIT.

Education

Rubinfeld graduated from the University of Michigan with a BSE in Electrical and Computer Engineering. Following that, she received her PhD from the University of California, Berkeley under the supervision of Manuel Blum.

Research

Rubinfeld's research interests include randomized and sublinear time algorithms. In particular, her work focuses on what can be understood about data by looking at only a very small portion of it.

Awards and honors
She gave an invited lecture at the International Congress of Mathematicians in 2006.
She became a fellow of the Association for Computing Machinery in 2014 for contributions to delegated computation, sublinear time algorithms and property testing. She was elected a fellow of the American Academy of Arts and Sciences (AAAS) in 2020 and a member of the National Academy of Sciences in 2022.

References

External links
Rubinfeld's MIT page

20th-century American mathematicians
21st-century American mathematicians
American computer scientists
MIT School of Engineering faculty
Living people
Theoretical computer scientists
University of California, Berkeley alumni
American women computer scientists
University of Michigan College of Engineering alumni
Fellows of the Association for Computing Machinery
Year of birth missing (living people)
Academic staff of Tel Aviv University
Fellows of the American Academy of Arts and Sciences
Members of the United States National Academy of Sciences
American women academics
21st-century American women scientists